Naulila was the scene of fighting between Portuguese Angola and German South West Africa during the early stages of World War I. On 19 October 1914, a German military column crossed the border and entered Angola without authorization from the Portuguese authorities. The column was intercepted by Portuguese forces and conducted to Fort Naulila. At Naulila, a dispute occurred between the Portuguese and the Germans which resulted in the death of three German officers.

On 31 October, the Germans under the command of Oswald Ostermann retaliated, and raided the Portuguese fort at Cuangar, destroying the fort and killing all stationed border guards with machine-guns. This was later referred to as the "Cuangar Massacre". On 18/19 December, Victor Franke led a successful retaliatory attack, defeating the Portuguese at Naulila.

Battles of World War I involving Portugal
1914 in Angola